The Northern Line is a commuter rail line operated by IZBAN using tracks owned by the Turkish State Railways. The line runs from north from Alsancak Terminal in Izmir to the town of Aliağa. 

Train service on the line was inaugurated on 5 December 2010 between Alsancak and Çiğli. Service was extended further north to Aliağa on 30 January 2011.

Overview
Between Cumaovası and Menemen, a total of 86 trains operate in each direction daily (42 continuing on to Aliağa, 42 continuing to Tepeköy). The first train leaves Alsancak at 5:57, and the last train leaves at 1:00.

Passengers may transfer to the İzmir Metro at Halkapınar, and connections are available to the State Railway's regional and main line trains at Çiğli and Menemen.

References

İZBAN
Rapid transit in Turkey
Railway lines in Turkey
Standard gauge railways in Turkey